Jamillette Gaxiola (born 1989 in Mazatlán, Mexico) is a Mexican-Cuban model and beauty pageant titleholder who represented Cuba in the 2009 Miss Earth pageant, held in November 2009.

Personal life
The daughter of Mexican Sergio Gaxiola Fajardo and Cuban-born Judith Kremets Liwants of Lebanese descent, Jamillette currently attends community college in Las Vegas, Nevada, where she lives with her family. She attended Cimarron-Memorial High School. She is currently a cast member of the hit reality TV show The Shores on the TV Guide Channel.

Pageantry
Gaxiola began participating in local pageants at age three. At the age of eighteen, she competed in Señorita Republica Deportiva 2007 produced by Univision where she placed 2nd runner-up. A year later, she competed in Miss Mexico USA as Miss Sinaloa. Because she is of Cuban descent on her mother's side, Jamillette was eligible to represent that country in Miss Earth 2009.

Gaxiola also participated in Miss Grand International 2013 and finished as a Top 10 finalist.

References

http://www.missgrandinternational.com/

External links
Official Miss Earth website
Miss Cuba Organization website
Official Jamillette Gaxiola Website

1989 births
Living people
Miss Earth 2009 contestants
Cuban female models
Cuban people of Lebanese descent
Cuban people of Mexican descent
Mexican female models
Mexican people of Cuban descent
Mexican people of Lebanese descent
Models from Sinaloa
People from Mazatlán
Cuban beauty pageant winners